Batı Merkez, is a surface rapid transit station of the Ankara Metro. Currently, only one line is in operation at this station. The station was opened on 12 February 2014, the same day the M3 line opened.

References

External links
EGO Ankara - Official website

Railway stations opened in 2014
Ankara metro stations
2014 establishments in Turkey
Transit centers in Ankara